The Democratic National Initiative (IDN) was a political party in Andorra.

History
Although political parties were not legalised until 1993, the party contested the 1992 elections in the Escaldes-Engordany parish, but failed to win a seat.

In the 1993 elections it received 15.3% of the vote and won two seats in the General Council. In the 1997 elections it saw its vote share fall to 11.4% but retained both seats. Thereafter the party did not contest any further elections.

References

Defunct political parties in Andorra
Political parties with year of establishment missing
Political parties with year of disestablishment missing